At the 2001 National Games of China, the athletics events were held at the Guangdong Olympic Stadium in Guangzhou, Guangdong Province, PR China from 17 to 23 November 2001. A total of 46 events were contested, 24 by male and 22 by female athletes. The National Games marathon race was held before the main competition, as it was incorporated into that year's Beijing Marathon on 14 October.

Medal summary

Men

Women

References

Medals and schedule
广东代表团成为新霸主--第九届全国运动会最终奖牌榜 (Ninth National Games Final Medal Table) . Sohu Sports. Retrieved on 2013-03-27.
Athletics schedule . 9thGames. Retrieved on 2013-03-27.
Results
第9届全国运动会各项比赛前三名 (9th National Games Medalists) . jx918. Retrieved on 2013-03-27.

External links
Official website (archived)
People Daily website
Games articles from People Daily (archived)

2001
National Games of the People's Republic of China
Athletics